The Wisconsin model of socio-economic attainment is a model that describes and explains an individual's social mobility and its economic, social, and psychological determinants. The logistics of this model are primarily attributed to William H. Sewell and colleagues including Archibald Haller, Alejandro Portes and Robert M. Hauser. The model receives its name from the state in which a significant amount of the research and analysis was completed. Unlike the previous research on this topic by Peter Blau and Otis Dudley Duncan, this model encompasses more than just educational and occupational factors and their effect on social mobility for American males. The Wisconsin model has been described as "pervasive in its influence on the style and content of research in several subfields of sociology."

Prior research
Before the framework for the Wisconsin model was constructed, Peter Blau and Otis Duncan established the first model of social mobility of its kind. However, the Blau-Duncan model was made up of only five predictors. These included father's education and occupation, the individual's education and first job, and the individual's job several years later.

Purpose
Sewell and his counterparts aimed to contribute to the Blau-Duncan model of status attainment by adding predictor variables. Because the results given by the Blau-Duncan model were based heavily on "structural factors as explanatory variables", the Wisconsin model was created to account for "social-psychological factors on educational and occupational attainment", which in turn, provided more accurate prediction. These variables, in turn, came from analyses done by Sewell and Haller in the 1950s and published (with Sewell's agreement) by Haller and Miller (1963, 1971). The latter work includes the theory on which the psychosociological variables of the WM are based.

Model variables
The model consisted of eight characteristics that most effectively linked socio-economic background and status attainment. These included occupational attainment, educational attainment, level of occupational aspiration, level of educational aspiration, the influence of significant others, academic performance, socioeconomic status, and mental ability.

Occupational attainment
Measured by Otis Dudley Duncan's socio-economic index of occupational status.

Educational attainment
Achieved by assigning a point value to certain levels of education that a subject has reached. In more recent studies using this model, educational attainment was classified into four levels: no post high school education, vocational school, college attendance, and a college degree. Earlier studies only classified subjects into those who went to college and those who did not.

Level of occupational aspiration
The subject's level is calculated by again categorizing Duncan's socioeconomic index scores in association with the occupation that the subject hope to hold in the future.

Level of educational aspiration
This is classified by the education level that each subject originally indicates that they hope to secure. Once again, some recent studies have assigned point values for three levels of desired education level: not continuing education after high school, vocational school, or college. Previous studies only categorized students based on which type institution they planned on attending prior to high school graduation.

Significant others' influence
This variable can be determined by evaluating three perceptions of the subject including: parental and teacher encouragement to attend college, as well as friends' college plans. Additional work regarding the influence of significant others on occupational aspirations was subsequently done by Haller and is students Joseph Woelfel and Ed L. Fink.

The original Sewell, Haller and Portes article Sewell which first reported the broad outlines of the Wisconsin model relied on data from a statewide survey of all Wisconsin high school seniors that included information about whether students perceived their parents, teachers and friends as expecting them to go to college. Later work initiated by Archie O. Haller and implemented by Joseph Woelfel and Edward L. Fink was able to survey adolescent students and identify the specific persons who communicated most with them about education and occupation, and who served as examples for their own educational and occupational futures. The "Significant Other Project" also produced survey instruments which identified the specific significant others for educational and occupational aspirations and measured their educational and occupational aspirations for the students

Academic performance
This value is calculated by the subject's high school class rank.

Socioeconomic status
In the original study, socio-economic status was determined by a weighted combination of mother's and father's education, father's occupation, and average annual income from 1957-1960.

Mental ability
This variable is determined by the analysis of standardized testing. In previous studies, statewide test results for high school juniors and seniors are compared with state intelligence norms.

Effects of social psychology and stratification research on the process of status attainment

Interpersonal influence
Primarily, the significant others' direct influence on the subject specifically relates to one's educational and occupational aspirations and also educational attainment. Basically, this implies that those who are constantly involved with a subject (mother, father, friend) will have a direct outcome on what type of education the subject receives.

Self-reflexive action
Essentially, this implies that a person's status attainment can only be limited by one's own "perceived ability". Social structural factors, however, determine the expectations of an individual's significant others—which then influence the person's attitudes. These attitudes  themselves then exert directive forces over both academic performance and later educational and occupational attainments.

Status aspirations
One's desire to attain status is an obligation for educational and occupational attainment.

Resulting hypotheses
Because this model organizes how status aspirations are formed and the way in which they influence "attainment-oriented behavior" the following conclusions can be drawn from the model:
"Status aspirations are complex forms of attitudes whose translation into attainment levels is affected by the context in which individuals attempt to enact them."

"Attitudes - including levels of aspiration - are formed and altered through two basic mechanisms; interpersonal influence, including reflexive adjustment of others' expectations, and including self-reflexion."

See also
 Status attainment
 Social mobility
 Social stratification

Notes

References
 
Haller, Archibald O., Woelfel, Joseph, and Fink, Edward L. (1968). The Wisconsin Significant Other Battery: Construction, Validation, and Reliability Tests of Questionnaire Instruments to Identify 'Significant Others' and Measure Their Educational and Occupational Expectations for High School Youth. Final Report. http://www.eric.ed.gov/PDFS/ED035990.pdf
 Hurst, Charles E (2007). Social Inequality: Forms, Causes, Consequences (Sixth Edition). Boston: Pearson Education, Inc. .
 

Social classes
Socio-economic mobility
University of Wisconsin–Madison